Ramón Jiménez-Gaona Arellano (born September 10, 1969) is a retired male discus thrower from Paraguay. During the presidency of Horacio Cartes he served as Paraguay's Minister of Public Works.

Sports career
Jiménez-Gaona represented his native country at three consecutive Summer Olympics (1988, 1992 and 1996). He twice won the title at the South American Championships (1993 and 1997).

Achievements

Education
Jiménez-Gaona studied Economics at the University of California, Berkeley. He started out an enterprise in the Paraguayan forestry sector, an activity in which he became a referent.

Politics
In August 2013, President Horacio Cartes appointed Jiménez Gaona to his cabinet as Minister of Public Works.

References

External links
Statistics

1969 births
Living people
Paraguayan discus throwers
Athletes (track and field) at the 1988 Summer Olympics
Athletes (track and field) at the 1992 Summer Olympics
Athletes (track and field) at the 1996 Summer Olympics
Olympic athletes of Paraguay
Athletes (track and field) at the 1995 Pan American Games
Pan American Games competitors for Paraguay
Paraguayan people of Basque descent
Paraguayan politicians
Government ministers of Paraguay
Public works ministers
University of California, Berkeley alumni
Male discus throwers
Paraguayan male athletes